The Polish Institute of Arts and Sciences of America (PIASA) is a Polish-American scholarly institution headquartered in Manhattan (New York City), at 208 East 30th Street.

History
The Institute was founded during the height of World War II, in 1942, by Polish scholars, including historian Stanisław Kot, anthropologist Bronisław Malinowski, poet Jan Lechoń, and historians Oskar Halecki and Rafał Taubenschlag, to continue the work and tradition of the prewar Polish Academy of Learning (Polska Akademia Umiejętności), headquartered in Kraków, Poland, which had been destroyed by Nazi Germany in 1939.

Since World War II, the Institute has continued its work of promoting Polish and Polish-American excellence in learning, and of advancing the knowledge of Polish history and culture in the English-speaking world.  Since Poland's resumption of a more complete sovereignty following the collapse of communism in central and eastern Europe, the Polish Institute has established collaborative scholarly relations with the restored Polish Academy of Learning and numerous other Polish academic and cultural centers.

Since its creation, the Institute has included some 1,500 scholars and artists, including Zbigniew Brzeziński, Jan Henryk De Rosen, Stanisław Skrowaczewski, Aleksander Wolszczan, Hilary Koprowski, Waclaw Szybalski, Michael Novak, Bohdan Pawłowicz and Nobel Prize winners Roald Hoffmann, Czesław Miłosz and Frank Wilczek.

The Institute maintains a library and archives, and publishes a peer-reviewed scholarly quarterly, The Polish Review.

The Houston Chapter founded the journal Houston Sarmatian in 1981. In 1988 it was renamed the Sarmatian Review.

References

External links
 

Learned societies of Poland
Polish-American culture in New York City
Polish-American organizations
Organizations established in 1942
1942 establishments in New York (state)